Thoras is a commune in the Haute-Loire department in south-central France.

History 
On 1 January 2016, Thoras annexed the neighboring commune of Croisances.

Population

See also
Communes of the Haute-Loire department

References

External links
History of Thoras

Communes of Haute-Loire

Communes nouvelles of Haute-Loire